This is a list of cricketers who have played first-class, List A or Twenty20 cricket for Jharkhand cricket team. Seasons given are first and last seasons; the player did not necessarily play in all the intervening seasons. Players in bold have played international cricket.

A
Varun Aaron

D
Kumar Deobrat
Mahendra Singh Dhoni

G
Shiv Gautam
Sunny Gupta

J
Ishank Jaggi

K
Ishan Kishan
Sumit Kumar

N
Shahbaz Nadeem
Rameez Nemat

Q
Samar Quadri

R
Rushik patel

S
Rahul Shukla
Jaskaran Singh
Kaushal Singh
Rituraj Singh
Virat Singh

T
Saurabh Tiwary

V
Manish Vardhan
Akash Verma

Jharkhand cricketers

cricketers